Alpha Polaris is a point-and-click horror adventure game, developed by Finnish company Turmoil Games and published by Just a Game. It was released for Microsoft Windows on June 24, 2011. The game is set in a research station in Greenland.

Story 

Rune Knudsen is a Norwegian biologist and the protagonist living at the American exploratory oil facility/research station Alpha Polaris in Greenland. Among the crew is Al Schaumann, the leader of the station, Tully Crean, a coarse and somewhat obnoxious handyman, Alistair Euler, the arrogant son of the company's CEO who arrives for a sudden unscheduled inspection and Nova whom Rune has romantic feelings for.

Al finds a crevasse with a cave on the walls. Inside the cave he finds something that resemble human bones and an aged parchment showing dark images and strange pictographs. During the nights, the ion storm of the century is gathering and the crew starts to experience horrible night terrors, causing them to go increasingly anxious and insane with paranoia. Soon, Rune investigates the bones and the cave discovering that there might have been an ancient renegade tribe who committed cannibalism and worshiped a vicious entity known as the Wendigo.

Soon, things escalates drastically as Tully commits suicide, Alistair becomes insane with paranoia believing that Rune killed Nova and Al is possessed to build a grotesque effigy made out animal bones and human body parts and plans to sacrifice Nova in order to release the Wendigo from beyond the aurora rift. Rune manages to stop the ritual, leaving only him and Nova as the last survivors. They drive off to Thule past a polar bear who looks at them curiously, revealing that the Wendigo's evil has truly been vanquished.

References

External links 
 

2011 video games
Psychological horror games
Point-and-click adventure games
Video games developed in Finland
Video games set in Greenland
Wendigos in popular culture
Windows games
Windows-only games